Aidan White is a journalist. He is the founder (2012) of the Ethical Journalism Network, a global campaign promoting self-regulation, good governance and ethical conduct in media. He was the General Secretary of the International Federation of Journalists from 1987 until April 2011. He previously worked for several newspapers in the United Kingdom. He was with The Guardian in London prior to joining the IFJ. He is a long-time campaigner for journalists' rights and is a former activist with the National Union of Journalists in Great Britain and Ireland. In 2021 he was made a Member of Honour of the union.

He was born in the Creggan area of Derry City in Northern Ireland in 1951.

His recent publications include Journalism, Civil Liberties and the War on Terror (2006), Making a World of Difference: the Story of Global Unions(2006) and To Tell You the TRUTH: the Ethical Journalism Initiative (2008).

In 1999 White led international media criticism of the NATO bombing of Radio Television Serbia (RTS) in which 16 media staff were killed claiming that this would lead to targeting of media in other conflicts. In 2002 the IFJ welcomed the imprisonment of a government official for failing to evacuate the RTS building despite warnings of an imminent military strike. "Warnings were given and they were blatantly and recklessly ignored," said White.

In late August 2009 White criticized the United States Department of Defense for hiring the Rendon Group to profile journalists who wrote about the war on terror.
He wrote:

White is the former chair of the Appointments Panel of the UK independent press regulator IMPRESS, and a former member of the Board of Statewatch. He has also served as Honorary President of the journalism ethics charity MediaWise  and as a contributing editor and adviser to the Media Diversity Institute <www.media-diversity.org/>

He is also one of the 25 leading figures on the Information and Democracy Commission launched by Reporters Without Borders.

References

External links
 Ethical Journalism Network 
 International Federation of Journalists

1951 births
Living people
British male journalists